Survivors Rowe is a Canadian documentary film, directed by Daniel Roher and released in 2015. The film profiles three of the victims of Ralph Rowe, a former Anglican Church of Canada priest who was convicted in 2012 of sexual abuse against First Nations boys from the Nishnawbe Aski Nation in Northern Ontario.

The film premiered on April 26, 2015, at the Hot Docs Canadian International Documentary Festival. It was subsequently broadcast on TVOntario in 2016, and received a Canadian Screen Award nomination for Best Documentary Program at the 5th Canadian Screen Awards.

References

2015 films
2015 documentary films
Canadian documentary films
Documentary films about First Nations
Documentary films about pedophilia
Films directed by Daniel Roher
2010s English-language films
2010s Canadian films